Mattia Pegorari (born 11 September 1983) is an Italian freestyle skier. He competed in the men's moguls event at the 2006 Winter Olympics.

References

External links
 

1983 births
Living people
Italian male freestyle skiers
Olympic freestyle skiers of Italy
Freestyle skiers at the 2006 Winter Olympics
Sportspeople from the Province of Sondrio
21st-century Italian people